Hemibagrus divaricatus is a species of bagrid catfish found in the Perak River drainage in the western Peninsula of Malaysia.

References

Bagridae
Fish of Asia
Fish of Malaysia
Taxa named by Heok Hee Ng
Taxa named by Maurice Kottelat
Fish described in 2013